East Haddon is a small village and civil parish in West Northamptonshire in England. The village is located eight miles from Northampton and is surrounded by the villages of Holdenby, Ravensthorpe and Long Buckby. The location between Northampton and Long Buckby provides useful train links towards London and Birmingham. At the time of the 2001 census, the parish's population was 651 people, falling to 643 at the 2011 census.

The villages name means 'Heathy hill'. 'East' to distinguish from West Haddon.

Facilities
East Haddon has a primary school, a church, a village hall and historical items dotted around it such as the old hall, the village pump and the old chapel. East Haddon has one pub, the Red Lion. The village is in the Guilsborough School catchment area, which is now in the top 1,000 schools in the country and in the top 10 in the county.

It is also home to the Show Gardens of Haddonstone, a company formed and based in the village since 1971. The gardens have been featured in books by gardening writers Peter Coates and Timothy Mowl. The show gardens are on the site of the company's head offices. The gardens are maintained throughout the year and contain Garden Ornament and Cast Stone architecture products that Haddonstone sell.  The gardens are also open for the National Garden Scheme, and raised over £1,000 in May 2012.

East Haddon's relatively small population of around 600 people maintains a tennis club, a gardening club, a history society, a couple of successful cricket teams and three book clubs. A popular bridge group meet in the village hall weekly and the village hall is the venue for regular quiz nights and celebratory events. The village running club has about 35 members and has been affiliated since 2002.

The East Haddon Players is one of many village drama groups in the area, but uniquely East Haddon's company write their own material from scratch each year. Stories are always based in the village and to one degree or another feature East Haddon history. The group was formed to celebrate the millennium, and following the performance of Timelines didn't want to give up. A book of village history was published at the same time.

Notable buildings

The Parish Church of Saint Mary 
The oldest building in the village is the East Haddon Church. The church was built in the 12th century and restored in the 14th century. The village's bells were installed in 1621 and a fifth was added in 1731.  The first ever recorded peal on five bells was rung on New Year's Day 1756, lasting over three hours with 5,040 changes.

East Haddon Hall 
East Haddon Hall is a Grade I listed building and was built in 1780 for the Sawbridge Family by John Wagstaff Fun, a builder from Daventry. It was built to a design by John Johnson of Leicester.

In 1941 blues singer Long John Baldry was born at the hall.

References

Villages in Northamptonshire
West Northamptonshire District
Civil parishes in Northamptonshire